Matenga is often a Maōri name. Notable people with the name include:

 Edward Matenga, Zimbabwean archaeologist
 Hoani Matenga (born 1987), New Zealand rugby player
 Huria Matenga (1842–1909), New Zealand tribal leader and landowner
 Joey Matenga Ashton (1907–1993), New Zealand railway worker, sportsman, and dance band leader
 Te Matenga Taiaroa (1795–1863), New Zealand tribal leader
 Te Matenga Tamati (died 1914), New Zealand religious leader
 Edwina Matenga, Cook Islander footballer on the national team
 Luciana Matenga, Cook Islander netball player at the 2010 Commonwealth Games
 Margharet Matenga, Cook Islander netball player who joined the New Zealand national team in 1979
 Matenga Baker, New Zealand tribal leader and father of actress Tungia Baker
 Matenga Baker (rugby), New Zealand rugby player in the Spanish club UE Santboiana
 Hemi Matenga Waipunahau (died 1912), New Zealand landowner and namesake of the Hemi Matenga Memorial Scenic Reserve
 Teariki Matenga, Cook Islander and first coalition Minister of Justice